Daniel Ledwell is a Canadian record producer and multi-instrumentalist. He lives in Halifax, Nova Scotia, and is married to singer-songwriter Jenn Grant.

Music career 

In 2008 Ledwell produced his debut solo album, Two Over Seven in his home studio. It was released on Emm Gryner's record label Dead Daisy Records. Since then, Ledwell has also produced albums for such musicians as Jenn Grant, Don Brownrigg, Heather Green, Fortunate Ones, Quiet Parade, Gabrielle Papillon, Lennie Gallant and Justin Rutledge. He was named producer of the year at the East Coast Music Awards in 2013 and again in 2014.

Art & Design 
Ledwell, who is originally from Charlottetown, received a fine arts degree from Mount Allison University, where he met his former bandmates in In-Flight Safety.

In addition to his musical work, he is also a painter and designer, and has designed album covers for many musicians. He also illustrated I Am an Islander, a book by his brother, comedian Patrick Ledwell.

References

External links 
 

Musicians from Charlottetown
Artists from Prince Edward Island
Canadian male singer-songwriters
Canadian singer-songwriters
Canadian keyboardists
Canadian record producers
Year of birth missing (living people)
Mount Allison University alumni
Canadian graphic designers
Canadian painters
Living people
21st-century Canadian painters
Canadian male painters
Canadian indie rock musicians
Canadian Folk Music Award winners
21st-century Canadian male singers
21st-century Canadian male artists